1-Octadecene is a long-chain hydrocarbon and an alkene with the molecular formula CH2=CH(CH2)15CH3.  It is one of many isomers of octadecene.  Classified as an alpha-olefin, 1-octadecene is the longest alkene that is liquid at room temperature.

Hydrosilation
Treatment of 1-octadecene with trichlorosilane in the presence of platinum catalysts gives octadecyltrichlorosilane.  Octadecene adds to hydrogen-terminated bulk silicon.

See also
 C18H36

References

Alkenes
Hydrocarbon solvents